Poa annua, or annual meadow grass (known in America more commonly as annual bluegrass or simply poa), is a  widespread low-growing turfgrass in temperate climates. Notwithstanding the reference to annual plant in its name, perennial bio-types do exist. This grass may have originated as a hybrid between Poa supina and Poa infirma.

Description
It has a slightly creeping, fibrous, rootstock. The stem grows from 15–25 cm (6-10 in.) high. It is slightly flattened, due to being folded rather than rolled.

The panicle is open and triangular shaped, 5 to 7.5 cm (2 to 3 in.) long. The spikelets are stalked, awnless, 1 to 2 cm (3/8 to 3/4 in.) long when flowering, and loosely arranged on delicate paired or spreading branches.  Sometimes they are tinged purple.

The vivid green leaves are short and blunt at the tips, shaped like the prow of a small canoe.  They are soft and drooping.  Long sheaths clasp the stem.  The leaves are smooth above and below, with finely serrated edges.  Occasionally the leaves are serrated transversely.

The ligule is pointed and silvery. Compared this to Common Meadowgrass Poa pratensis, which has a squared ligule, and Poa trivialis, which has a pointed, but less silvery ligule.

The leaves are smooth above and below, with finely serrated edges.  Occasionally the leaves are serrated transversely.

It is in flower all year around except for severe winters.  The seeds ripen and are deposited 8 months of the year.  The plant grows rapidly from seed, flowering within 6 weeks, seeding and then dying.

Etymology
Poa is derived from the Greek name for a type of fodder grass. Annua is Latin, meaning 'annual' or 'lasting a year'.

Distribution and habitat
It is a common weed of cultivation, known in the Americas as annual bluegrass. It occurs as a common constituent of lawns, where it is also often treated as a weed, and grows on waste ground. Many golf putting greens, including the Oakmont Country Club greens, are annual bluegrass, although many courses have converted to creeping bentgrass (Agrostis stolonifera).

It has appeared on King George Island in the Antarctic South Shetland Islands  as an invasive species, as well as on Australia's subantarctic Heard and Macquarie Islands.

References

External links 
European Poa Database
 The Observers Book of Grasses, Sedges and Rushes. Frances Rose.  pages 38–39
Kew gardens grass database
Weeds friend or foe? Sally Roth. pages 86–87
BSBI Description

annua
Flora of Europe
Flora of Africa
Flora of temperate Asia
Flora of tropical Asia
Garden plants of Europe
Lawn grasses
Plants described in 1753
Taxa named by Carl Linnaeus
Invasive plant species of subantarctic islands